The Shore Conference is an athletic conference of private and public high schools in the U.S. state of New Jersey, centered at the Northern Jersey Shore. All schools in this conference are located within Monmouth County and Ocean County. The Shore Conference is broken up into six classes based on school size and location. Classes change every two years based upon school size. The league operates under the jurisdiction of the New Jersey State Interscholastic Athletic Association (NJSIAA).

Member schools
Member schools, broken down by division for 2018-2019 and 2019–2020, are:

Division A - North
Christian Brothers Academy
Freehold High School
Freehold Township High School
Howell High School
Long Branch High School
Manalapan High School
Marlboro High School
Middletown High School South

Division A - Central
Holmdel High School
Manasquan High School
Monmouth Regional High School
Raritan High School
Red Bank Catholic High School
Rumson-Fair Haven Regional High School
Shore Regional High School
St. Rose High School

Division A - South
Brick Memorial High School (known as Brick Township Memorial High School)
Brick Township High School
Central Regional High School
Jackson Memorial High School
Southern Regional High School
Toms River High School East
Toms River High School North
Toms River High School South

Division B - North
Colts Neck High School
Matawan Regional High School
Middletown High School North
Neptune High School
Ocean Township High School
Red Bank Regional High School
St. John Vianney High School
Wall High School

Division B - Central

Asbury Park High School
Henry Hudson Regional High School
Keansburg High School
Keyport High School
Mater Dei High School
Point Pleasant Beach High School
Ranney School
Trinity Hall

Division B - South
Barnegat High School
Donovan Catholic High School (known as Monsignor Donovan High School until 2014)
Jackson Liberty High School
Lacey Township High School
Lakewood High School
Manchester Township High School
Pinelands Regional High School
Point Pleasant Borough High School

Accomplishments
In 2014, the Shore Conference swept all four sectional titles in Central Jersey in football. The Champions are:
CJG1; Shore Regional High School
CJG2: Rumson-Fair Haven Regional High School
CJG3: Matawan Regional High School
CJG4: Jackson Memorial High School 
CJG5: Manalapan High School
Also Red Bank Catholic High School won their first sectional championship in 38 years against Delbarton.

References

External links
DigitalSports Shore Conference website
Shore Conference Bowling
Shore Conference Track and Field
Shore Conference website
New Jersey State Interscholastic Athletic Association (NJSIAA)

 
 
New Jersey high school athletic conferences